The 1961 Iowa Hawkeyes football team represented the University of Iowa in the 1961 Big Ten Conference football season. Led by first-year head coach Jerry Burns, the Hawkeyes compiled an overall record of 5–4 with a mark of 2–4 in conference play, tying for seventh place in the Big Ten. The team played home games at Iowa Stadium in Iowa City, Iowa.

Schedule

Roster

Rankings

Game summaries

California

at USC

Indiana

Wisconsin

Purdue

at Ohio State

Minnesota

at Michigan

Notre Dame

1962 NFL Draft

References

Iowa
Iowa Hawkeyes football seasons
Iowa Hawkeyes football